, officially the , is a 1,510-seat multi-purpose hall located in Niigata, Japan. It opened in 1994 and has hosted artists such as Whitesnake, Yngwie Malmsteen and Helloween.

References

Music venues in Japan
Buildings and structures in Niigata (city)
Music venues completed in 1994
1994 establishments in Japan